The South African Council for the Architectural Profession (SACAP) is a professional organisation for the architectural community in South Africa. It was established 
"To guide, facilitate and promote a high standard of competency and responsibility in the architectural profession and to increase public awareness of the range of architectural services offered. To ensure the profession fulfils its total role in the development of South Africa."
Its aim is to maintain the standard of education given to architects at technikons and universities through the granting of professional certification. These functions were taken over from the South African Council for Architects in 2001 due to the Architectural Profession Act 2000, Act 44 of 2000.

See also
Professional requirements for architects# South Africa
List of architecture schools in South Africa
South African Institute of Architects

References

External links
http://www.sacapsa.com/

Professional associations based in South Africa
Research institutes in South Africa
Architecture in South Africa